Cassidy's Restaurant and Bar, or simply Cassidy's, is a restaurant in Portland, Oregon.

Description 
Cassidy's is a restaurant on Washington Street in southwest Portland's West End district. Portland Monthly has said, "For over three decades, this dimly lit downtown bar and restaurant has been serving late night crowds. Menu staples include local seafood, braised short rib, pork belly, pasta and salad." The interior features an ornate bar and dark-wood paneling. The menu also includes pork belly ramen, a cheeseburger on a brioche bun, and the Sazerac.

History 
Cassidy's was established in 1979. Bob Cassidy is the owner. In 2021, a fire on an above floor caused smoke and water damage, forcing the restaurant to close temporarily. The restaurant shared a building with a residential living center prior to Taft Home's closure in late 2021.

Reception 

In her Insiders' Guide to Portland, Oregon, Rachel Dresbeck wrote, "Cassidy's reputation as a good late-night bar is so firm that we sometimes forget how good the food is. Premium-cut meats, crispy Wallapa Bay oysters with spicy cocktail sauce, creamy pastas—all these go beautifully with the local wines and microbrews that Cassidy's also features. The bar's dark paneling and old-fashioned wooden refrigerators remind us of Boston or New York, but the food and drinks are definitely Portland." Michael Russell included Cassidy's in The Oregonian's 2014 list of "the top 10 classic Portland bars". He characterized the clientele as "off-duty bartenders and undercover rock stars" and said the restaurant's signature drink is "a pint of Anchor Steam, always on draft". He wrote: Samantha Bakall included Cassidy's in the newspaper's 2016 "ultimate guide to downtown Portland's best happy hours". She wrote, "For the low admission price of one drink, post up at this classic downtown happy hour spot steps away from the Crystal Ballroom. Hearty plates like burgers, mac n’ cheese, breakfast for dinner and more range from $5–$8."

In 2019, Thomas Ross of the Portland Mercury wrote:

References

External links 

 
 
 Cassidy's at Zomato

1979 establishments in Oregon
Restaurants established in 1979
Restaurants in Portland, Oregon
Southwest Portland, Oregon